The 2017 Codasur South American Rally Championship is an international rally championship sanctioned by the FIA and run by the Confederacion Deportiva Automovilismo Sudamericana (Codasur). The championship was contested over five events held in five different countries across South America, running from March to November.

The championship was won for the fifth time by Paraguayan driver Gustavo Saba. Saba only won the Rally de San Juan but with three second places that was enough for Saba to defeat Argentine driver Marcos Ligato by less than six points despite winning three rallies. Paraguayan driver Miguel Zaldivar Sr. was third in the championship after winning the final rally of the season in Uruguay.

Event calendar and results

The 2017 Codasur South American Rally Championship was as follows:

Championship standings
The 2017 Codasur South American Rally Championship points were as follows:

References

External links

Codasur South American Rally Championship
Codasur South America
Codasur South American Rally Championship